No Shooting Time for Foxes is a 1966 West German drama film directed by Peter Schamoni. It was entered into the 16th Berlin International Film Festival where it won the Silver Bear Extraordinary Jury Prize.

Cast

References

External links

1966 films
1966 drama films
German drama films
West German films
1960s German-language films
German black-and-white films
Films directed by Peter Schamoni
Films based on German novels
Silver Bear Grand Jury Prize winners
1960s German films